was a town located in Onsen District, Ehime Prefecture, Japan.

As of 2003, the town had an estimated population of 5,802 and a density of 155.63 persons per km2. The total area was 37.28 km2.

On January 1, 2005, Nakajima, along with the city of Hōjō, was merged into the expanded city of Matsuyama and no longer exists as an independent municipality.

External links
Official website of Matsuyama in Japanese

Dissolved municipalities of Ehime Prefecture
Matsuyama, Ehime